Salaam Said Al Shaksy (born 1961) is Chairman of Oman Housing Bank. 

Al Shaksy was also a member of the Board of Directors of Oman Oil Company and ORPIC Group. His other appointments included: Member of the Board of Al Raffd Fund (Oman's Government-funded SME fund); a member of Oman's 2040 Vision Economic Committee; Board Member of Oman Banks Association; Chairman of Oman Growth Fund; a member of Oman Business Forum; and Chairman of The Shaksy Group.

Prior to this he was Chief Integration Officer at Oman Arab Bank SAOG after its merger with Alizz Islamic Bank, where he served as Chief Executive Officer from 2014 to 2020.  Before this he was CEO of National Bank of Oman SAOG between 2010 and 2014, leading its turnaround and transformation during this period. Al Shaksy has held a number of senior executive positions including CEO of Dubai Banking Group, CEO of Dubai Islamic Investment Group and Deputy Chief Executive Officer of Bank Dhofar (where he led its merger with Majan International Bank in 2002). Within 1994-2000, Al Shaksy headed a group comprising three divisions - retail banking, investment banking and correspondent banking at the National Bank of Oman. He embarked on his banking career with Citibank Global Consumer Business, Dubai, UAE in 1992.

From 2015 to 2019, Al Shaksy served as a member of Oman's State Council and Deputy Head of its Economic Committee. His other previous roles include being a member of Diwan of Royal Court sponsored Sharakah Program; an Advisory Committee member for the National Leadership and Competitiveness Program; Chairman of Oman National Investment Corporation Holding; Deputy Chairman of the Board of Shell Oman Marketing and Chairman of its Board Audit Committee; Deputy Chairman of Muscat Securities Market; Board Member of Bank Muscat; and Board Member of College of Banking and Financial Studies.

Al Shaksy is the first Omani CEO of a full-fledged Islamic Bank in Oman and has received a number of awards in Banking, including "Banker of the Year 2008" - Banker Middle East, and recently awarded as one of the ‘Top 10 CEOs for Shari’a Compliant Banks’ for 2019 at the Top CEO Conference and Awards 2019 held in Bahrain. He is also a sought after keynote speaker at global financial conferences.

Al Shaksy is a graduate of Boston University, United States, where he received a bachelor's degree in Economics (cum laude), a Masters in Management Information Systems (Honors) and an MBA in Management of Financial Services (High Honors). He has also completed the Senior Executive Program from the London Business School, UK. He is married and has five children. He enjoys boating, chess and photography.

See also
Said bin Salim Al Shaksy
The Shaksy Group
alizz islamic bank

References 

Alumni of London Business School
Omani chief executives
1961 births
Living people
Boston University School of Management alumni
Northfield Mount Hermon School alumni